Vasili Dmitriyevich Trofimov (born 7 January 1919; died 22 September 1999) was a Soviet football player.

Playing career
The USSR champion in three sports: football (1940, 1945, 1949), ice hockey (1947), and bandy (1951, 1952) in the Dynamo (Moscow) teams.

International career
Trofimov made his debut for USSR on 15 July 1952 in a 1952 Olympics game against Bulgaria and scored on his debut. He also scored a goal against Yugoslavia.

Coaching career
From 1964 to 1981 he served as the senior coach of the Soviet Union national bandy team, which under his leadership eight times in a row became the world champion.

Honours
 Soviet Top League champion: 1940, 1945, 1949.
 Finalist of  Soviet Cup: 1945, 1950.

References

External links
  Profile
 Профиль на sports-reference.com (участники Олимпийских игр)

1919 births
1999 deaths
People from Korolyov, Moscow Oblast
Russian footballers
Soviet footballers
Association football forwards
Soviet Union international footballers
Olympic footballers of the Soviet Union
Footballers at the 1952 Summer Olympics
FC Dynamo Moscow players
Soviet Top League players
Burials at Vagankovo Cemetery
Honoured Masters of Sport of the USSR
Soviet bandy players
Soviet ice hockey players
Merited Coaches of the Soviet Union
Dynamo Moscow players
HC Dynamo Moscow players
Sportspeople from Moscow Oblast